The commune of Bukinanyana is a commune of Cibitoke Province in north-western Burundi. The capital lies at Bukinanyana.

References

Communes of Burundi
Cibitoke Province